Shabeg Singh, PVSM, AVSM (1 May 1924 – 6 June 1984), was a Major General who had previously served in the Indian Army but later joined the militant movement of Sant Jarnail Singh.

During his military service in the Indian Army, he was involved extensively in the training of Mukti Bahini volunteers during the Bangladesh Liberation War. He had fought in other major wars such as World War 2, 1947 Indo-Pak War and 1962 Sino-Indian War. He was dismissed from the army on the charges of corruption one day before his retirement, for which he sought redress in civil court, he had won all his court cases (Among the frivolous politically motivated charges were a corruption case was that he had bought a 'Jhonga' on proxy). Later, Singh joined the Dharam Yudh Morcha the movement to implement the Anandpur Sahib Resolution for federal distribution of powers between Punjab and the Union of India. As Bhindranwale sidestepped negotiations and a mutiny seemed imminent, he volunteered as an adviser and trainer for the rebellion forces.

Early life and education
Singh was born in 1925 in Khiala village (earlier known as Khiala Nand Singhwala), about nine miles (14 km) from the Amritsar-Chogawan road. He was the oldest son of Sardar Bhagwan Singh and Pritam Kaur, and had three brothers and a sister. He enrolled in Khalsa College in Amritsar, and later in Government College in Lahore.

Military career
In 1942, an officer-selection team visiting Lahore colleges recruited Singh to the British Indian Army officers cadre. After studying in the Indian Military Academy, he was commissioned in the Garhwal Rifles as a second lieutenant. Within a few days the regiment moved to Burma and joined the war against the Imperial Japan. In 1945 when the war ended, Singh was in Malaya with his unit. After the partition of India, when the Indian regiments were reorganized, Singh joined the 50th Parachute Brigade of the Indian Army. He was posted to the 1st Battalion of the Parachute Regiment, where he remained until 1959. Promoted to lieutenant-colonel on 2 June 1965, he later commanded the 3rd Battalion, 11 Gorkha Rifles, and was given command of a brigade on 4 January 1968. Singh was promoted to colonel on 12 June 1968 and to substantive brigadier on 22 December.

Singh was a notable figure with the press for his service in the Indo-Pakistani War of 1971. On 6 July 1972, he was appointed GOC, MPB & O Area, with the acting rank of major-general, and promoted to substantive major-general on 2 April 1974.

The day before retirement, he was stripped of his rank without court-martial and denied his pension. Two charge sheets in an anti-corruption court were brought against him in Lucknow by India's Central Bureau of Investigation. Singh sought redress in civil courts, and was acquitted of all charges on February 13, 1984.

Operation Blue Star

After his dismissal, Singh joined the Sikh leader of Damdami Taksal, Jarnail Singh Bhindranwale, where he served as Bhindranwale's military adviser. Singh had said that he had joined Bhindranwale due to the alleged humiliation he had received, which included being stripped of his pension despite all he had done for the country.

Counter Intelligence reports of the R&AW had reported that three prominent heads of the Khalsa Army were Major General Shabeg Singh, Balbier Singh and Amrik Singh.

In December 1983, the Sikh political party Akali Dal's President Harcharan Singh Longowal had invited Jarnail Singh Bhindranwale to take up residence in Golden Temple Complex. Singh and his military expertise is credited with the creation of effective defenses of the Temple Complex that made the possibility of a commando operation on foot impossible. He organised the Sikh forces present at the Harmandir Sahib in Amritsar in June 1984. Indian government forces launched Operation Blue Star in the same month.

At the initial stages of the operation, Singh was killed in firing between Akal Takht and Darshani Ḍeorhi. His body was later found and identified when the operation was over. Singh was cremated according to Sikh rites and with full military honors.

References

Bangladesh Liberation War
Punjabi people
People from Punjab, India
Indian generals
1925 births
1984 deaths